I Gusti Putu Oka Mona (26 August 1930 – 30 August 1996) was an Indonesian athlete. He competed in the men's high jump at the 1956 Summer Olympics.

References

External links
 

1930 births
1996 deaths
Athletes (track and field) at the 1956 Summer Olympics
Indonesian male high jumpers
Olympic athletes of Indonesia
People from Denpasar
Sportspeople from Bali
Balinese people
20th-century Indonesian people